The New Rockford-Carrington Twins were a minor league baseball team based in New Rockford, North Dakota in partnership with Carrington, North Dakota. In 1923,  the New Rockford-Carrington Twins briefly played as members of the North Dakota League, before the team relocated to become the Valley City Hi-Liners during the season.

History
The 1923 New Rockford-Carrington Twins began the season as charter members of the four–team 1923 Class D level North Dakota League. The New Rockford-Carrington franchise moved to Valley City, North Dakota on July 17, 1923 to become the Valley City Hi-Liners.

The New Rockford-Carrington/Valley City team was managed by Earl Pickering and placed 3rd in the final North Dakota State League standings with a combined regular season record of 30–38. The New Rockford-Carrington/Valley City team finished 17.5 games behind the 1st place Minot Magicians, 2.5 games behind the 2nd place Jamestown Jimkotas and 4.0 games ahead of the 4th place Bismarck Capitals.

The North Dakota League permanently folded after the 1923 season. The New Rockford, North Dakota and Carrington, North Dakota area has not hosted another minor league team.

The ballpark
The name of the New Rockford-Carrington home minor league ballpark is not directly referenced. References indicate the team played in New Rockford, North Dakota at the ballpark located at 8th Street South & 7th Avenue South, which today is the site of the Eddy County Fairgrounds.

The Valley City Hi-Liners were noted to have played home minor league games at Pioneer Park.

Year-by-year record

Notable alumni

Charlie Boardman (1923)
Frank Jude (1923)

See also
New Rockford-Carrington Twins players

References

External links
Baseball Reference

Professional baseball teams in North Dakota
Defunct baseball teams in North Dakota
Baseball teams established in 1923
Baseball teams disestablished in 1923
North Dakota League teams
Foster County, North Dakota
Eddy County, North Dakota